Reading Southern railway station was opened as the western terminus of the South Eastern Railway's route from , a junction station at the time of opening known as Reigate Junction in south-east Surrey, having direct links thence to Dover port, Brighton (a resort and fellow industrious town) and London Bridge. The station was referred to for exactly one century by an identical name to its neighbour, 'Reading', until 1949.  Seven years after its opening the station expanded its uses by becoming the terminus of a new company's Waterloo to Reading line from London Waterloo station.  This mid-length line added to the town's connections with more intermediate stops, beyond nearby Wokingham and mid-south parts of Surrey which had been directly served by the station and added a competing service, approximately one third longer in distance to a London terminus than the adjacent Great Western Railway.

The station closed for all purposes in 1970 when its demolition began.  It was adjacent to, and to the south-east of, the Great Western Railway's Reading General station known since the other station's closure as Reading railway station. Part of the latter's 1989-built concourse is on the site of the west end frontage of the demolished Southern station.

History

Construction and early years
The original route of the South Eastern Railway (SER) was from London Bridge station to Dover, which took a route through  so that several compass point sector-based companies could share the same lines and engineering (including a substantial tunnel) through the North Downs. The line from Reading to Redhill was built by the Reading, Guildford and Reigate Railway (RG&RR), and was opened in 1849: the section from Reading to Farnborough was opened on 4 July 1849, with the last section being opened on 15 October. From the start, the RG&RR was worked by the SER, which leased it from 16 July 1846, and absorbed it in 1852.

Reading had been served by the Great Western Railway (GWR) since 1840.  The competing 1855 SER station was west of Vastern Road, on the corner of Blagrave Street and Station Road, adjacent to but south-east of the GWR station, and at a lower level.

In this way Reading gained a service into London Waterloo station. The SW&WJR was absorbed by the LSWR in 1878.

The original station did not last long, since it was destroyed by fire in 1859 after being struck by lightning. A replacement was built, which had two platform faces; it was enlarged in 1896 by the provision of two more faces following the resiting of the locomotive shed.

The middle period

In 1899 the South Eastern Railway handed over its operations to a new organisation co-owned with the London, Chatham and Dover Railway (LCDR), which traded as the South Eastern and Chatham Railway (SE&CR); the line and station continued to be owned and maintained by the SER. In 1923, the LSWR and SER amalgamated, together with other railways including the LCDR (and thus the SE&CR), to form the Southern Railway (SR), which assumed complete control of Reading station and its approaches.

In 1900, there were ten trains each weekday from Waterloo to Reading; by 1914 there were 14, and in 1922, 18. The services tended to be irregular, until the electrification of the inner suburban lines from Waterloo during 1915–16 brought a clock-face pattern to those services, in order to make it easy for people who did not understand timetables; the steam-hauled services, such as those to Reading, had to fit in (there were eight electric trains per hour on the Reading line as far as ) and so became more regular.

During the Dunkirk evacuation (27 May-4 June 1940), 293 special trains arrived at Reading from the Channel ports, most of which were handed over to the GWR.

After the War, there was only one train from Reading to London via the SER route, the 7.27am to London Bridge, which arrived at 9.49, and the 5.25pm return, arriving back at Reading at 7.59. Three coaches sufficed between Reading and Redhill; but by 1960, six were required. The locomotive was normally a Schools class 4-4-0 based at Redhill.

At Nationalisation, the Southern Railway effectively became the Southern Region of British Railways, and things continued more or less as before; but the station (originally named simply Reading) was renamed Reading South on 26 September 1949, to distinguish it from the adjacent Western Region (ex-GWR) station (which became Reading General at the same time).

Later years and closure

Reading South was renamed again on 11 September 1961, becoming Reading Southern. The station remained independent of Reading General for several years following Nationalisation, but was transferred to Western Region control in March 1965; within a few months the two stations shared a common station manager. Soon the new management decided to spend £250,000 on improvements at Reading General, which included works to divert the Waterloo and Guildford services into the latter station, which would allow the Southern station to be closed.

In the station's final arrangement, there were four platforms; east of Vastern Road were a locomotive depot on the north side of the line, and a goods shed and sidings on the south side.

The passenger station was closed on 6 September 1965, with services being diverted into Reading General; most (including all the electric services) then used a newly built platform 4A at the latter station, which was long enough for an eight-coach train. It was intended that the non-electric (Guildford line) services would use the older platforms at Reading General; but in practice, these used platform 4A as well. Freight continued to be handled until September 1970, when all goods services were withdrawn except for the Huntley & Palmers biscuit traffic, which lasted until April 1979.

After demolition the site of the passenger station was used as a car park for Reading General. In 1989 a new concourse for Reading station was built on the site, and no trace now remains of the former SER station.

Connections between the SER and GWR routes

The first connection,  in length, was laid in from some sidings on the north side of the GWR line, burrowing under that line, connecting with the SER line facing east; none of it was owned by the SER: the LSWR owned the easternmost  and the GWR the remainder. It connected into the GWR main line to the west of the station, and since there were no platforms on the connection, it was primarily used for goods trains, being first used on 1 December 1858.

A second connection was built to the west of the first one, and was opened on 17 December 1899. This was quite steep.

A third connection to the east of the previous two was opened on 26 May 1941, and like the second allowed trains stopping in the GWR station to run to or from the SER line.

When the SER station closed in 1965, the connection built in 1899 was relaid to allow the services over the former SER line to run into the newly built Platform 4A at Reading General.

Locomotive depot
The SER built an engine shed adjacent to the station in 1852. It was replaced by another structure in 1875, and re-roofed in the early 1950s. Like the station, it closed in 1965.

The 1875 depot was constructed on the north side of the line, situated to the east of Vastern Road between the SER and GWR lines. It had a brick-built shed, with three tracks, one of which was used by the LSWR. The  turntable was replaced in 1926 by one of  diameter. On 15 October 1898, the SER had 22 locomotives allocated to Reading. Normally, about twenty locomotives were based at Reading; the allocation fell from 22 to 17 upon electrification in 1939. Locomotive classes allocated in 1950 were mostly ex-SECR types: they included eight 2-6-0s of the SR U class; seven 4-4-0s, mostly of the SECR D class; and two 0-6-0T shunting engines of the SECR R1 class. Following Nationalisation, the code 70E was allotted to Reading depot in 1950, which it retained until 1959, when it became a sub-shed of Basingstoke. The depot was reduced in importance in May 1954, when most of the locomotives were transferred away leaving just two shunting engines, but complete closure did not occur until January 1965.

Electrification

Since 1903 the Southern Railway and its constituents had pursued a policy of electrification, which began with the routes closest to the London termini and gradually worked outwards. Electric trains reached  on 3 January 1937, and in that year, several electrification schemes were proposed by the Southern Railway, which included the route from Virginia Water to Reading. As part of these works, new berthing sidings were provided at Reading. The electric service from Waterloo to Reading was introduced on 1 January 1939; trains were every 20 minutes at peak times and every 30 minutes off-peak and on Sundays. Most trains ran non-stop between Waterloo and Staines, and on the outward journey they divided at Ascot (with one portion continuing to Guildford via ), whilst on the London-bound trip, the two portions would be combined again at Ascot. The total journey time from Waterloo to Reading was reduced from 90 minutes to 75.

New electric trains were built for these services, which consisted of two-coach units; up to four units could be coupled to make a train of up to eight coaches. Each coach of a unit had the seating in compartments, flanked by a driving cab at one end and a lavatory at the other, and there was a side corridor (although there were no gangway connections between the coaches); this was to allow the passengers access to the lavatory. One of the coaches had both first- and third-class compartments, and seated 24 in first-class and 32 in third; the other coach had only third-class, seating 52, but also had a brake section for the guard and luggage, together with the traction motors. The units were known as the "2-BIL" type.

The electric trains bore headcodes to inform both passengers and staff of the route, origin and destination of the train, but not necessarily the direction. Several were used: for example, in March 1939, trains running between Waterloo and Reading bore number 27 if running via Brentford, or 28 if running via Richmond. If the train was equipped to show only letters as headcodes instead of numbers, letter L was used for all services between Reading and Ascot or Waterloo, sometimes with two dots or a bar above the letter to denote different destinations or routes.

The sidings at Reading were used to stable electric trains overnight and at off-peak hours; for example, in Summer 1955, six 2-BIL units would be left in the sidings overnight.

Dieselisation

Unlike the line to Waterloo via Bracknell, the North Downs Line to Redhill was not electrified beyond Wokingham, apart from short stretches shared with other routes. The first Beeching report recommended curtailing the passenger service at Guildford and the closure of all stations between Shalford and Betchworth inclusive. The second Beeching report recommended that the whole of the North Downs Line should be developed as a trunk route for freight services. The passenger service along the entire line was however reprieved, provided that costs could be reduced. The steam-hauled services were to be withdrawn, but money was not available for new Diesel trains. Instead, in 1964, six three-car trains were provided by putting together spare coaches from elsewhere on the network: twelve came from disbanded 6-S units on the Hastings line, six of which had Diesel engines and driving cabs; there were also six driving trailers from 2-EPB electric trains available. One coach of each type was coupled together to form a three-car unit; these were officially designated the 3-R units, but were popularly known as "tadpoles" because the former EMU driving trailer was noticeably wider than the two Hastings coaches.

The service was second-class only, with a normal off-peak service interval of 60 minutes. Most trains consisted of one "tadpole" unit, but a few services were operated using BRCW Type 3 Diesel locomotives hauling three ordinary coaches.

Accidents
On 12 September 1855, a light engine (i.e. an engine running alone, without a train) was sent from Reading to Guildford on the down line, even though it was to travel in the up direction. After running for about a mile, it collided with the 4.40 pm service from London Bridge to Reading, which was running correctly on the down line. The driver of the light engine and four passengers were killed; ten more were seriously injured, and three of those died later in hospital.

Routes

See also
London and South Western Railway
Reading railway station
Reading West railway station
South Eastern and Chatham Railway
South Eastern Railway
Southern Railway

Notes

References

Further reading
Nock (1965) The London & South Western Railway
Williams (1968) The London & South Western Railway, vol. 1
Williams (1973) The London & South Western Railway, vol. 2

External links
Subterranea Britannica: Reading Southern Station
Reading Southern Station on navigable O.S. map

Railway stations in Great Britain opened in 1855
Railway stations in Great Britain closed in 1965
Disused railway stations in Berkshire
Former South Eastern Railway (UK) stations
1855 establishments in England
1965 disestablishments in England